Alexander "Alex" MacKinnon (born 16 February 1952) is a Canadian former professional darts player who competed in the 1980s.

Career
MacKinnon competed in the 1984 BDO World Darts Championship but was defeated in the first round by John Joe O'Shea of Ireland. He returned a year later in the 1985 BDO World Darts Championship, losing in the first round to England's Dave Whitcombe.

MacKinnon also played in the 1983 Winmau World Masters he defeating by Paul Lim in the Last 64, but lost in the Last 32 to Roy Baillie.

MacKinnon won the 1984 Ontario Open he beating by the final Canadian's Bob Sinnaeve.

He quit the BDO in 1986.

World Championships results

BDO
 1984: Last 32: (lost to John Joe O'Shea 0–2)
 1985: Last 32: (lost to Dave Whitcombe 0–2)

External links
Profile and stats on Darts Database

Canadian darts players
Place of birth missing (living people)
Living people
British Darts Organisation players
1952 births
Sportspeople from Rhyl